The oxide mineral class includes those minerals in which the oxide anion (O2−) is bonded to one or more metal alloys. The hydroxide-bearing minerals are typically included in the oxide class. The minerals with complex anion groups such as the silicates, sulfates, carbonates and phosphates are classed separately.

Simple oxides:
XO
Periclase group
Periclase 
Manganosite 
Zincite group
Zincite 
Bromellite 
Tenorite 
Litharge 

Cuprite 
Ice 

Hematite group
Corundum 
Hematite 
Ilmenite 

Rutile group
Rutile 
Pyrolusite 
Cassiterite 
Baddeleyite 
Uraninite 
Thorianite 

Spinel group
Spinel 
Gahnite 
Magnetite 
Franklinite 
Chromite 
Chrysoberyl 
Columbite 

Hydroxide subgroup:
Brucite 
Manganite 
Romanèchite 
Goethite group:
Diaspore 
Goethite

Nickel–Strunz Classification -04- Oxides 
IMA-CNMNC proposes a new hierarchical scheme (Mills et al., 2009). This list uses it to modify the Classification of Nickel–Strunz (mindat.org, 10 ed, pending publication).

Abbreviations:
"*" - discredited (IMA/CNMNC status).
"?" - questionable/doubtful (IMA/CNMNC status).
"REE" - Rare-earth element (Sc, Y, La, Ce, Pr, Nd, Pm, Sm, Eu, Gd, Tb, Dy, Ho, Er, Tm, Yb, Lu)
"PGE" - Platinum-group element (Ru, Rh, Pd, Os, Ir, Pt)
03.C Aluminofluorides, 06 Borates, 08 Vanadates (04.H V[5,6] Vanadates), 09 Silicates:
Neso: insular (from Greek νησος nēsos, island)
Soro: grouping (from Greek σωροῦ sōros, heap, mound (especially of corn))
Cyclo: ring
Ino: chain (from Greek ις [genitive: ινος inos], fibre)
Phyllo: sheet (from Greek φύλλον phyllon, leaf)
Tekto: three-dimensional framework
Nickel–Strunz code scheme: NN.XY.##x
NN: Nickel–Strunz mineral class number
X: Nickel–Strunz mineral division letter
Y: Nickel–Strunz mineral family letter
##x: Nickel–Strunz mineral/group number, x add-on letter

Class: oxides 
 04.A Metal:Oxygen = 2.1 and 1:1
 04.AA Cation:Anion (M:O) = 2:1 (and 1.8:1): 05 Ice, 10 Cuprite, 15 Paramelaconite
 04.AB M:O = 1:1 (and up to 1:1.25); with small to medium-sized cations only: 05 Crednerite, 10 Tenorite; 15 Delafossite, 15 Mcconnellite; 20 Bromellite, 20 Zincite; 25 Lime, 25 Bunsenite, 25 Monteponite, 25 Manganosite, 25 Periclase, 25 Wustite
 04.AC M:O = 1:1 (and up to 1:1.25); with large cations (± smaller ones): 05 Swedenborgite; 10 Brownmillerite, 10 Srebrodolskite; 15 Montroydite, 20 Litharge, 20 Romarchite, 25 Massicot
 04.B Metal:Oxygen = 3:4 and similar
 04.BA With small and medium-sized cations: 05 Chrysoberyl, 10 Manganostibite
 04.BB With only medium-sized cations: 05 Filipstadite, 05 Donathite?, 05 Gahnite, 05 Galaxite, 05 Hercynite, 05 Spinel, 05 Cochromite, 05 Chromite, 05 Magnesiochromite, 05 Manganochromite, 05 Nichromite, 05 Zincochromite, 05 Magnetite, 05 Cuprospinel, 05 Franklinite, 05 Jacobsite, 05 Magnesioferrite, 05 Trevorite, 05 Brunogeierite, 05 Coulsonite, 05 Magnesiocoulsonite, 05 Qandilite, 05 Ulvospinel, 05 Vuorelainenite; 10 Hydrohetaerolite, 10 Hausmannite, 10 Iwakiite, 10 Hetaerolite; 15 Maghemite, 20 Tegengrenite, 25 Xieite
 04.BC With medium-sized and large cations: 05 Marokite, 10 Dmitryivanovite
 04.BD With only large cations: 05 Minium
 04.C Metal:Oxygen = 2:3, 3:5, and Similar
 04.CB With medium-sized cations: 05 Tistarite, 05 Auroantimonate*, 05 Brizziite-VII, 05 Brizziite-III, 05 Corundum, 05 Eskolaite, 05 Hematite, 05 Karelianite, 05 Geikielite, 05 Ecandrewsite, 05 Ilmenite, 05 Pyrophanite, 05 Melanostibite, 05 Romanite*; 10 Bixbyite, 10 Avicennite; 15 Armalcolite, 15 Mongshanite*, 15 Pseudobrookite; 20 Magnesiohogbomite-6N6S, 20 Magnesiohogbomite-2N3S, 20 Magnesiohogbomite-2N2S, 20 Zincohogbomite-2N2S, 20 Ferrohogbomite-2N2S; 25 Pseudorutile, 25 Ilmenorutile; 30 Oxyvanite, 30 Berdesinskiite; 35 Olkhonskite, 35 Schreyerite; 40 Kamiokite, 40 Nolanite, 40 Rinmanite; 45 Stibioclaudetite, 45 Claudetite; 50 Arsenolite, 50 Senarmontite; 55 Valentinite, 60 Bismite, 65 Sphaerobismoite, 70 Sillenite, 75 Kyzylkumite
 04.CC With large and medium-sized cations: 05 Chrombismite, 10 Freudenbergite, 15 Grossite, 20 Mayenite, 25 Yafsoanite; 30 Barioperovskite, 30 Lakargiite, 30 Natroniobite, 30 Latrappite, 30 Lueshite, 30 Perovskite; 35 Macedonite, 35 Isolueshite, 35 Loparite-(Ce), 35 Tausonite; 40 Crichtonite, 40 Dessauite, 40 Davidite-(Ce), 40 Davidite-(La), 40 Mathiasite, 40 Lindsleyite, 40 Landauite, 40 Loveringite, 40 Loveringite, 40 Cleusonite, 40 Gramaccioliite-(Y); 45 Hawthorneite, 45 Magnetoplumbite, 45 Haggertyite, 45 Batiferrite, 45 Hibonite, 45 Nezilovite, 45 Yimengite, 45 Diaoyudaoite, 45 Lindqvistite, 45 Plumboferrite; 50 Jeppeite, 55 Zenzenite, 60 Mengxianminite*
 04.D Metal:Oxygen = 1:2 and similar
 04.DA With small cations
 (moved to -09- Subclass: tektosilicates)
 04.DB With medium-sized cations; chains of edge-sharing octahedra: 05 Tripuhyite, 05 Tugarinovite, 05 Varlamoffite*, 05 Argutite, 05 Cassiterite, 05 Rutile, 05 Pyrolusite, 05 Plattnerite, 05 Squawcreekite?; 10 Bystromite, 10 Ordonezite, 10 Tapiolite-(Fe), 10 Tapiolite-(Mn), 10 Tapiolite*, 15a Paramontroseite, 15a Ramsdellite, 15b Akhtenskite, 15c Nsutite; 20 Scrutinyite; 25 Ixiolite, 25 Ishikawaite, 25 Srilankite, 25 Samarskite-(Y), 25 Samarskite-(Yb), 25 Yttrocolumbite-(Y); 30 Heftetjernite, 30 Wolframoixiolite*, 30 Krasnoselskite*, 30 Ferberite, 30 Hubnerite, 30 Sanmartinite, 30 Wolframite*; 35 Tantalite-(Mg), 35 Tantalite-(Fe), 35 Tantalite-(Mn), 35 Columbite-(Mg), 35 Columbite-(Fe), 35 Columbite-(Mn), 35 Qitianlingite; 40 Ferrowodginite, 40 Lithiotantite, 40 Lithiowodginite, 40 Tantalowodginite*, 40 Titanowodginite, 40 Wodginite, 40 Ferrotitanowodginite; 45 Tivanite, 50 Carmichaelite, 55 Alumotantite, 60 Biehlite
 04.DC With medium-sized cations; sheets of edge-sharing octahedra: 05 Bahianite, 10 Simpsonite
 04.DD With medium-sized cations; frameworks of edge-sharing octahedra: 05 Anatase, 10 Brookite
 04.DE With medium-sized cations; with various polyhedra: 05 Downeyite, 10 Koragoite; 15 Koechlinite, 15 Russellite, 15 Tungstibite; 20 Tellurite, 25 Paratellurite; 30 Cervantite, 30 Bismutotantalite, 30 Bismutocolumbite, 30 Clinocervantite, 30 Stibiocolumbite, 30 Stibiotantalite; 35 IMA2007-058, 35 Baddeleyite
 04.DF With large (± medium-sized) cations; dimers and trimers of edge-sharing octahedra: 05 Nioboaeschynite-(Y), 05 Aeschynite-(Ce), 05 Aeschynite-(Nd), 05 Aeschynite-(Y), 05 Nioboaeschynite-(Ce), 05 Nioboaeschynite-(Nd), 05 Tantalaeschynite-(Y), 05 Rynersonite, 05 Vigezzite, 10 Changbaiite, 15 Murataite
 04.DG With large (± medium-sized) cations; chains of edge-sharing octahedra: 05 Euxenite-(Y), 05 Loranskite-(Y), 05 Polycrase-(Y), 05 Uranopolycrase, 05 Fersmite, 05 Kobeite-(Y), 05 Tanteuxenite-(Y), 05 Yttrocrasite-(Y); 10 Fergusonite-beta-(Nd), 10 Fergusonite-beta-(Y), 10 Fergusonite-beta-(Ce), 10 Yttrotantalite-(Y); 15 Foordite, 15 Thoreaulite; 20 Raspite
 04.DH With large (± medium-sized) cations; sheets of edge-sharing octahedra:
 IMA/CNMNC revised the Pyrochlore supergroup 2010 (04.DH.15 and 04.DH.20)
 05 Brannerite, 05 Orthobrannerite, 05 Thorutite; 10 Kassite, 10 Lucasite-(Ce)
 Pyrochlore group: Fluorcalciopyrochlore, Fluorkenopyrochlore, Fluornatropyrochlore, Fluorstrontiopyrochlore, Hydropyrochlore, Hydroxycalciopyrochlore, Kenoplumbopyrochlore, Oxycalciopyrochlore, Oxynatropyrochlore, Oxyplumbopyrochlore, Oxyyttropyrochlore-(Y)
 Microlite group: Fluorcalciomicrolite, Fluornatromicrolite, Hydrokenomicrolite, Hydromicrolite, Hydroxykenomicrolite, Kenoplumbomicrolite, Oxycalciomicrolite, Oxystannomicrolite, Oxystibiomicrolite
 Romeite group: Cuproromeite, Fluorcalcioromeite, Fluornatroromeite, Hydroxycalcioromeite, Oxycalcioromeite, Oxyplumboromeite, Stibiconite
 Betafite group: Calciobetafite, Oxyuranobetafite
 Elsmoreite group: Hydrokenoelsmoreite
 25 Rosiaite; 30 Zirconolite-3O, 30 Zirconolite-3T, 30 Zirconolite-2M, 30 Zirconolite; 35 Liandratite, 35 Petscheckite; 40 Ingersonite, 45 Pittongite
 Discredited minerals 04.DH.15: Bariomicrolite (of Hogarth 1977), Bariopyrochlore (of Hogarth 1977), Betafite (of Hogarth 1977), Bismutomicrolite (of Hogarth 1977), Ceriopyrochlore (of Hogarth 1977), Jixianite, Natrobistantite, Plumbomicrolite (of Hogarth 1977), Plumbobetafite (of Hogarth 1977), Stannomicrolite (of Hogarth 1977), Stibiobetafite (of Černý et al.), Yttrobetafite (of Hogarth 1977), Yttropyrochlore (of Hogarth 1977), Bismutopyrochlore (of Chukanov et al.) and Bismutostibiconite 04.DH.20
 04.DJ With large (± medium-sized) cations; polyhedral frameworks: 05 Calciotantite, 05 Irtyshite, 05 Natrotantite
 04.DK With large (± medium-sized) cations; tunnel structures: 05 Ankangite, 05 Coronadite, 05 Hollandite, 05 Manjiroite, 05 Mannardite, 05 Redledgeite, 05 Priderite, 05 Henrymeyerite, 05 Akaganeite, 10 Cryptomelane, 10 Romanechite, 10 Strontiomelane, 10 Todorokite
 04.DL With large (± medium-sized) cations; fluorite-type structures: 05 Cerianite-(Ce), 05 Zirkelite, 05 Thorianite, 05 Uraninite; 10 Calzirtite, 10 Hiarneite, 10 Tazheranite
 04.DM With large (± medium-sized) cations; unclassified: 05 Sosedkoite, 05 Rankamaite; 15 Cesplumtantite, 20 Eyselite, 25 Kuranakhite
 04.E Metal:Oxygen = < 1:2
 04.E: IMA2008-040
 04.EA Oxides with metal : oxygen < 1:2 (M2O5, MO3): 05 Tantite, 10 Krasnogorite*, 10 Molybdite
04.X Unclassified Strunz Oxides
04.XX Unknown: 00 Allendeite, 00 Ashanite?, 00 Hongquiite*, 00 Psilomelane?, 00 Uhligite?, 00 Clinobirnessite*, 00 Kleberite*, 00 Chubutite*, 00 Struverite?, 00 IMA2000-016, 00 IMA2000-026

Class: hydroxides 
 04.F Hydroxides (without V or U)
 04.FA Hydroxides with OH, without H2O; corner-sharing tetrahedra: 05a Behoite, 05b Clinobehoite; 10 Sweetite, 10 Wulfingite, 10 Ashoverite
 04.FB Hydroxides with OH, without H2O; insular octahedra: 05 Shakhovite; 10 Cualstibite, 10 Zincalstibite
 04.FC Hydroxides with OH, without H2O; corner-sharing octahedra: 05 Dzhalindite, 05 Sohngeite, 05 Bernalite; 10 Burtite, 10 Mushistonite, 10 Natanite, 10 Vismirnovite, 10 Schoenfliesite, 10 Wickmanite; 15 Jeanbandyite, 15 Mopungite, 15 Stottite; 15 Tetrawickmanite; 20 Ferronigerite-6N6S, 20 Ferronigerite-2N1S, 20 Magnesionigerite-6N6S, 20 Magnesionigerite-2N1S; 25 Magnesiotaaffeite-6N3S, 25 Magnesiotaaffeite-2N2S, 25 Ferrotaaffeite-6N3S
 04.FD Hydroxides with OH, without H2O; chains of edge-sharing octahedra: 05 Spertiniite; 10 Bracewellite, 10 Diaspore, 10 Guyanaite, 10 Groutite, 10 Goethite, 10 Montroseite, 10 Tsumgallite; 15 Manganitev; 20 Cerotungstite-(Ce), 20 Yttrotungstite-(Y), 20 Yttrotungstite-(Ce); 25 Frankhawthorneite; 30 Khinite, 30 Parakhinite
 04.FE Hydroxides with OH, without H2O; sheets of edge-sharing octahedra: 05 Amakinite, 05 Brucite, 05 Portlandite, 05 Pyrochroite, 05 Theophrastite, 05 Fougerite; 10 Bayerite, 10 Doyleite, 10 Gibbsite, 10 Nordstrandite; 15 Boehmite, 15 Lepidocrocite; 20 Grimaldiite, 20 Heterogenite-2H, 20 Heterogenite-3R; 25 Feitknechtite, 25 Lithiophorite; 30 Quenselite, 35 Ferrihydrite; 40 Feroxyhyte, 40 Vernadite; 45 Quetzalcoatlite
 04.FF Hydroxides with OH, without H2O; various polyhedra: 05 Hydroromarchite
 04.FG Hydroxides with OH, without H2O; unclassified: 05 Janggunite, 10 Cesarolite, 15 Kimrobinsonite
 04.FH Hydroxides with H2O ± (OH); insular octahedra: 05 Bottinoite, 05 Brandholzite
 04.FJ Hydroxides with H2O ± (OH); corner-sharing octahedra: 05 Sidwillite, 05 Meymacite; 10 Tungstite; 15 Ilsemannite, 15 Hydrotungstite; 20 Parabariomicrolite
 04.FK Hydroxides with H2O ± (OH); chains of edge-sharing octahedra: 05 Bamfordite
 04.FL Hydroxides with H2O ± (OH); sheets of edge-sharing octahedra: 05 Meixnerite, 05 Jamborite, 05 Iowaite, 05 Woodallite, 05 Akdalaite, 05 Muskoxite; 10 Hydrocalumite, 15 Kuzelite; 20 Aurorite, 20 Chalcophanite, 20 Ernienickelite, 20 Jianshuiite; 25 Woodruffite, 30 Asbolane; 40 Takanelite, 40 Rancieite; 45 Birnessite, 55 Cianciulliite, 60 Jensenite, 65 Leisingite, 75 Cafetite, 80 Mourite, 85 Deloryite
 04.FM Hydroxides with H2O ± (OH); Unclassified: 15 Franconite, 15 Hochelagaite, 15 Ternovite; 25 Belyankinite, 25 Gerasimovskite, 25 Manganbelyankinite; 30 Silhydrite, 35 Cuzticite, 40 Cyanophyllite
 04.FN: 05 Menezesite
 04.G Uranyl Hydroxides
 04.GA Without additional cations: IMA2008-022; 05 Metaschoepite, 05 Paraschoepite, 05 Schoepite; 10 Ianthinite; 15 Metastudtite, 15 Studtite
 04.GB With additional cations (K, Ca, Ba, Pb, etc.); with mainly UO2(O,OH)5 pentagonal polyhedra: 05 Compreignacite, 05 Agrinierite, 05 Rameauite; 10 Billietite, 10 Becquerelite, 10 Protasite; 15 Richetite; 20 Calciouranoite, 20 Bauranoite, 20 Metacalciouranoite; 25 Fourmarierite, 30 Wolsendorfite, 35 Masuyite; 40 Metavandendriesscheite, 40 Vandendriesscheite; 45 Vandenbrandeite, 50 Sayrite, 55 Curite, 60 Iriginite, 65 Uranosphaerite, 70 Holfertite
 04.GC With additional cations; with UO2(O,OH)6 hexagonal polyhedra: 05 Clarkeite, 10 Umohoite, 15 Spriggite
 04.H V[5,6] Vanadates
 (moved to -08- Class: vanadates)
 04.I Ice group
04.X Unclassified Strunz Oxides (Hydroxides)
04.XX Unknown: 00 Ungursaite*, 00 Scheteligite?

References 

Palache, Charles, Harry Berman and Clifford Frondel, 1944, The System of Mineralogy, Wiley, 7th ed. Vol. 1, p. 490 ff.
Klein, Cornelis and Cornelius S. Hurlbut, Jr., 1985, Manual of Mineralogy, Wiley, 20th ed., pp. 295–318
Webmineral Dana Oxides